Bruce W. Goodwin (September 8, 1949 – September 14, 2020) was an American politician, serving as a state representative in the Ohio House of Representatives. He was a former educator.

Personal life
Goodwin was married and has two children. Goodwin died on September 14, 2020 from cancer.

Education
Goodwin went to Ayersville High School prior to attending Defiance College. He received a master's degree at St. Francis College and continued his education at the University of Toledo and Bowling Green State University.

Career
Goodwin worked as a teacher and in school administration prior to his government service.  In addition, he worked as director of the Four County Career Center, chairman of the State Legislative Committee for the Ohio Career and Technical Association, and chairman of the State Board of Directors for Trade and Industry.

Government Service
Goodwin serves in the 74th district of the Ohio State House of Representatives representing Fulton, Williams, and Defiance counties.

References

External links
Bruce W. Goodwin at the Ohio House of Representatives
 

1949 births
2020 deaths
Bowling Green State University alumni
Defiance College alumni
Republican Party members of the Ohio House of Representatives
People from Defiance, Ohio
University of Toledo alumni
21st-century American politicians
Schoolteachers from Ohio